"Standing on the Shore" is a song by Australian electronic music duo Empire of the Sun and the third single from their debut album Walking on a Dream. The single was released in June 2009, along with a cover of the Black Box Recorder song "The Art of Driving" as a B-side and features Steele's wife Jodi Steele on vocals. The B-side was originally recorded as the music for the advertisement of the new BMW Z4.
 
The song received extensive airplay on the Nova radio network in 2009. The song was featured in episode 4 of season 6 of HBO's Entourage on 2 August 2009, during the closing credits.

Music video
The music video for "Standing on the Shore" was shot at Lancelin, north of Perth, Australia. The video clip was directed by Josh Logue of Mathematics and choreographed by Serena Chalker and Quindell Orton of Perth dance company Anything Is Valid Dance Theatre (AIVDT). The video is also the first to only feature Steele and not Littlemore. The video first aired on 17 June 2009.

Track listings
UK 7-inch limited-edition vinyl single
 Blue-colored see-through vinyl
 "Standing on the Shore" – 4:22
 "The Art of Driving" – 4:32

iTunes digital download
 "Standing on the Shore" – 4:22
 "The Art of Driving" – 4:32

Charts

Release history

References

Empire of the Sun (band) songs
2008 songs
2009 singles
EMI Records singles
Songs written by Luke Steele (musician)
Songs written by Nick Littlemore
Songs written by Peter Mayes